The Volkswagen Volksbus is a range of step-floor city bus chassis assembled in Germany and produced by the Brazilian manufacturer Volkswagen Truck & Bus from 1993 to present.

Today Volkswagen Truck & Bus produce bus chassis in the 5 to 18 tonne category as microbuses, minibuses, midibuses and coaches, the majority of them are powered by MWM engines.

Variants
Note: E = Electronic versions, D = Front engine, T = Rear engine
8.140 CO
8.150 OD
8.150 EOD
9.150 OD
9.150 EOD
9.160 OD
15.180 EOD
16.180 CO
16.210 CO Euro II
17.210 OD
17.210 EOD
17.240 OT
17.260 EOT
18.310 OT
18.310 OT Titan
18.320 EOT

Current range
Microbus
5.140 EOD
8.120 OD Euro III
8.150 OD (Export)
8.150 EOD

Minibus
9.150 OD (Export)
9.150 EOD
9.160 OD

Medium
15.180 EOD
15.190 EOD
17.210 EOD
17.230 EOD
17.260 EOT

Coach
18.280 OT LE
18.320 EOT

Conversions
All bodies are assembled by private coachbuilders.  The coachbuilders then manufacture them to desired configuration e.g. school bus, shuttle bus, tour bus & coaches etc.

Main users of Volksbus chassis' are:

South American manufacturers
Irizar
Marcopolo
Neobus
Caio Induscar
Rosmo
Comil
AGA
Mascarello
Modasa
Inrecar
Metalpar

Mexican Manufacturers
AYCO
Novacapre

South African manufacturers
Busmark 2000
Busaf
Irizar
Marcopolo
Kenyan Manufacturers
Banbros

See also 

 Microbus
 Minibus
 Midibus
 Coach (bus)

References

External links

Volkswagen Volksbus International portal
South African Constellation & Volksbus specifications
VW de México truck site 
Autobuses AGA de Colombia

Volksbus
Bus chassis
Buses of Germany
Coaches (bus)
Midibuses
Minibuses
Vehicles introduced in 1993